Blackwell Mill is a location in Derbyshire, near to the village of Blackwell near Buxton, but not part of it.

There was once a corn mill on the River Wye which may have dated from 1066. Most of it has disappeared, apart from the weir. What is left is marked as an Ancient Monument.

It stands at the meeting point of several valleys: Great Rocks Dale, Chee Dale and Ashford Dale. In times past the Manchester Turnpike forded the river. It marks the northern end of the public path from Bakewell, used by walkers and cyclists, called the Monsal Trail.

The trail follows the trackbed of the former Midland Railway main line from London to Manchester. Blackwell Mill lies between Bakewell and Buxton, on the Midland's attempt to extend the Manchester, Buxton, Matlock and Midlands Junction Railway into Manchester. This point was the south curve of the triangular junction which it built when it, instead, extended to New Mills.

There was a railway station variously called "Blackwell Mill" or "Blackwell Mill Halt". Long enough only for one carriage, it was reputed to be the smallest passenger station on British Railways. It consisted of two short platforms, with no buildings, apart from a small shelter, which although derelict is still standing despite the station closing in 1967. The halt was for the railway workers who lived in the still-existing, and still occupied, eight terraced cottages nearby in the valley. The station was also included in a Pathé News film in 1938.

Passengers and goods from Buxton wishing to transfer to or from the Midland Main Line travelled past this point, to then change trains at Millers Dale.

The branch carried on into Buxton along Wye Dale, crossing the main A6 road and the river by a high twin-arched girder bridge, before entering Pig Tor Tunnel (191 yards), where it emerged into Ashwood Dale, followed by the  Ashwood Dale Tunnel.

Route

See also
 Monsal Trail
 List of Tunnels in the United Kingdom

References
 Truman, P., Hunt, D., (1989) Midland Railway Portrait, Sheffield: Platform 5 Publishing
 Radford, B., (1988) Midland Though The Peak, Unicorn Books

External links

Transport in Derbyshire
Peak District
Rail transport in Derbyshire
Railway stations closed in 1967